Robin Behn (born 1958) is an American poet, and professor at University of Alabama and Vermont College of Fine Arts.

She grew up in Barrington, Illinois. She graduated from Oberlin College, the University of Missouri, and University of Iowa. 
Her work has appeared in Cortland Review, Perihelion, Poetry, and Kenyon Review.

Awards
1999 Guggenheim Fellowship
National Endowment for the Arts Fellowship

Works

The Red Hour, HarperCollins, 1993,  

 Naked Writing, DoubleCross Press, 2008
 The Yellow House, Spuyten Duyvil, 2010,

Editor

References

1958 births
Living people
Oberlin College alumni
University of Missouri alumni
University of Alabama faculty
Poets from Illinois
Vermont College of Fine Arts faculty
National Endowment for the Arts Fellows
American women poets
American women academics
21st-century American women